Totora Municipality is the first municipal section of the Carrasco Province in the Cochabamba Department, Bolivia. Its seat is Totora.

Subdivision 
Totora Municipality is divided into four cantons.

Languages 
The languages spoken in the municipality are mainly Quechua and Spanish.

References 

  Instituto Nacional de Estadistica de Bolivia  (INE)

External links 
 Population data and map of Totora Municipality

Municipalities of the Cochabamba Department